Manibhadresvara Temple – II is an abandoned Hindu temple located in Bhubaneswar, Orissa, India.

Location 
It is situated on the left side of the Rath Road branching from Mausima (Ramesvara) temple to Badheibanka Chowk. The temple now stands on private land.

History 
It is privately owned by Rabindra Kumar Paramaguru. Its architectural features indicate that it was formed in the 8th century.

Architecture 
Its typology is Rekha deul in the Kalingan style. The temple is surrounded by Paramaguru temple, shops, a well and residential buildings. The temple faces east. On plan, the temple has a square vimana that measures 2.20 square meters. On elevation, the temple is a triratha that measures 4.20 m in height. Pabhaga is buried, jangha 1.00 m, gandi 3.00 m, mastaka 0.20 m. The amalaka stone is broken.

Decorative features include door jams that measure 1.20 m in height x 0.90 m in width, a plain lintel. It is built with grey sandstone using dry masonry.

Conservation 
Cracks have developed in all sides of the temple. Pabhaga is buried and the kanika paga has collapsed. The temple is crumbling.

References 

 Dr. Sadasiba Pradhan & Team, Dated on 15.11.2006, Debala Mitra, ‘Bhubaneswar’ New Delhi, 1958, p. 29.
 K.C. Panigrahi, Archaeological Remains at Bhubaneswar, Calcutta, 1961. pp. 16–17.
 L. S.S. O’ Malley, Bengal District Gazetteer Puri, Calcutta, 1908, p. 240.
 M.M. Ganguly, Orissa and Her remains, Calcutta, 1912, PP. 393–394.
 p.R. Ramachandra Rao, Bhubaneswar Kalinga Temple Architecture, Hyderabad, 1980, p. 29.
 R.P. Mohapatra, ‘Archaeology in Orissa’. Vol. I, Delhi, 1986. p. 57.
 R.L. Mitra. The Antiauities of Orissa, Vol.II, Calcutta, 1963, pp. 160–161.
 T.E. Donaldson, ‘Hindu Temple Art of Orissa’. Vol. I, Leiden, 1985, p. 76.
 Dr. Kumar L Pradhan A noted personality and guiding spirit among Sericulture Farming community & he has created Life Line to numerous Sericulture Farmers who are based in out of Mysore, Ramanagar, Tumkur & Kolar district. He is recipient of numerous awards showered to him by State and Central Government as well as by private institutions respectively. Citing his contribution to the society he is awarded honorary doctorate by Government of India His able work is admired by respective professionals, Farmers, Research institutes & intellectuals across spectrum of India & Last but not least he has also contributed immensely towards Shipping Industry & to bring positive changes in Supply Chain Management

External links 
 Temples of Orissa
 Orissa Tourism

Hindu temples in Bhubaneswar